The 2013 World Club 7s was the first edition of the rugby sevens tournament and was hosted at Twickenham Stadium in London, England on 17 and 18 August 2013.

Format
The teams were divided into pools of four teams, who played a round-robin within the pool. Points were awarded in each pool on the standard schedule for rugby sevens tournaments (though different from the standard in the 15-man game)—3 for a win, 2 for a draw, 1 for a loss. Following all the group games, the winner and runner up in each group progressed to the Knockout Stage along with the best two third-place teams.

Teams

Pool Stage

Pool A

Pool B

Pool C

Cup

Quarter-finals

Semi-finals

Final

Third/fourth place match

Plate (places 5 to 8)

Semi-finals

Final

Seventh/eighth place play-off

Shield (places 9 to 12)

Semi-finals

Final

Eleventh/twelfth place play-off

References

2013 rugby sevens competitions
Rugby sevens competitions in England
2013–14 in English rugby union
Rugby union in London
August 2013 sports events in the United Kingdom